Louis René Zome (born 6 April 1988 in Douala) is a Cameroonian footballer, currently who plays for Internationale Club De Football Budapest.

Career
Zome was also the captain of his team which won the 2008/2009 football championship in Cameroon. He was the highest goalscorer in the Cameroon MTN ELIT 1 in 2007/2008 season. After three successful seasons with Tiko United, was on 08. February 2011 sold to Israeli side Hapoel Acre A.F.C. He played his last Match for Acco on 14. January 2012, before returned to Cameroon. In 2013 Louis played for Beitar Ramle Tel Aviv in the second division in Israel. He moved to Hungary and played for Internationale Club De Football of Budapest. 2014 In 2016, he moved to first division in Malta and played for Gzira United FC and finished as league champion unbeaten

International career
Zome played with the Cameroon A PRIME National selection.

Notes

1988 births
Living people
Cameroonian footballers
Footballers from Douala
Association football forwards
Hapoel Acre F.C. players
Beitar Tel Aviv Bat Yam F.C. players
Ironi Nesher F.C. players
Expatriate footballers in Israel
Expatriate footballers in Malta
Cameroonian expatriate sportspeople in Israel
Cameroonian expatriate sportspeople in Malta